The 2006 Swiss Figure Skating Championships (officially named  and ) were held in Biasca from December 9 through 10th, 2005. Medals were awarded in the disciplines of men's singles, ladies' singles, and ice dancing.

Senior results

Men
Tobias Bayer of Germany was a guest competitor who finished 5th with a score of 122.00.

Ladies
Cornelia Bayermann of Germany was a guest competitor who finished 16th with a score of 68.99.

Ice dancing

External links
 results

Swiss Figure Skating Championships
Swiss Figure Skating Championships, 2006